St Peter's Church is a church in Belgrave, Leicestershire. It is a Grade II* listed building.

History

The church consists of a chancel, nave, south porch, vestry, tower and north and south aisles. The tower used to have a spire but this was removed in 1824. The chancel and arcades date from the 13th century. The chancel also has 13th century windows with spikes, quatrefoils and circles, as well as a 12th-century tomb slab, sedilia and Elizabethan tablet to Ambrose Belgrave (died 1571). The south porch was built in 1826.

The church was restored in 1857 and then again 3 years later by Ewan Christian. In 1861, W. Gillet restored the south aisle windows and George Gilbert Scott did some more work in 1877–78.

References

Belgrave
Belgrave